Mahmud Shaterian (1944–2006) was a famous Iranian Azerbaijani composer, musician and Tar master. He was born in Ahrab district of Tabriz. He had great role in surviving and preserving Azerbaijani music in Iran. He was also active in Radio and Television orchestra of Iran.

Sources
Mahmud Shaterian
Fars News

External links
Reference Site of Azerbaijani Music

People from Tabriz
1944 births
2006 deaths
Iranian composers